Christer Sjösten (2 September 1948 – 9 December 1979) was an international speedway rider from Sweden.

Speedway career 
Sjösten was a four time Swedish finalist in 1972, 1974, 1975 and 1977. He rode in the top tier of British Speedway from 1971 to 1979, riding for various clubs.

He died at the Royal Brisbane Hospital in Australia on 9 December 1979, following a serious accident at the Brisbane Exhibition Speedway during a tournament 8 days earlier. Following his death his older brother Sören Sjösten (one of the world's leading riders) retired.

See also
Rider deaths in motorcycle racing

References 

1948 births
1979 deaths
Swedish speedway riders
Exeter Falcons riders
Wembley Lions riders
Poole Pirates riders
Glasgow Tigers riders
People from Avesta Municipality
Motorcycle road incident deaths
Sport deaths in Australia
Sportspeople from Dalarna County